James Fisher and Sons plc is a British provider of marine engineering services, listed on the London Stock Exchange. It also remains a major shipowner, based in Barrow-in-Furness since the 1840s.

History
The company was founded by James Fisher in 1847 in Barrow-in-Furness as a ship-owning business transporting haematite from the Cumbrian hills. In 1868 it had 70 ships and by the 1870s it owned the largest coasting fleet in the United Kingdom. It acquired the Furness Shipbuilding Company in 1870 but only went on to build one ship, Ellie Park. During the 1880s it slowly moved from operating sailing ships to operating steamers.

It was first listed on the London Stock Exchange in 1952. From the 1960s the company was managed by Directors with no family connection. At that time it established a reputation for moving heavy equipment, including even locomotives, by sea. By 1965 it had built its first ship suitable for transporting irradiated nuclear fuel. In the 1960s the company chartered up to a dozen of its ships to the Atlantic Steam Navigation Company to operate the latter's Preston based container services across the Irish Sea. In 1984 the company acquired short sea and offshore specialists Coe Metcalf Shipping, lifting the fleet to 42 vessels, and in 1996 it acquired P&O Tankships.

The company's division James Fisher Defence formerly operated the submarine rescue service for the Royal Navy, and provided the submersible Scorpio 45 which saved the lives of seven Russian sailors in their submarine  in 2005. In 2005 James Fisher acquired Fendercare Marine Solutions Ltd for £12m and in 2007 it acquired Buchan Technical Services for £5m and F T Everard & Sons Ltd, a leading competitor in the UK coastal shipping market, for £35m. In 2013 James Fisher acquired Divex Ltd for an initial consideration of £20m in cash plus a further maximum additional consideration of £13m linked to future profitability targets.

Operations
The company operates from various locations throughout the world, with its corporate headquarters in Barrow in Furness, Cumbria, and provides the following services:
Defence (design, construction and operation of rescue submarines)
Port Agency
Renewable Energy services
Marine oil services
Offshore oil services
Shipping services
Specialist technical services

Fleet

The charter tanker fleet is operated by the subsidiary James Fisher Everard.

Sir John Fisher Foundation
The Sir John Fisher Foundation is a charitable trust established in 1980 by Sir John Fisher and his wife Lady Maria Fisher, in order to support good causes in the area surrounding the company's headquarters in Barrow-in-Furness. The foundation's capital fund includes its shareholding in James Fisher and Sons plc. The dividends paid by the company enable its trustees to make grants to charitable causes, throughout the UK, but with special regard to those based in and working for the benefit of people living in and around Barrow-in-Furness and surrounding area.

References

Further reading
Watson, Nigel, Round The Coast And Across the Sea, St Matthews Press, 2000

External links
Official site
Sir John Fisher Foundation

Engineering companies of the United Kingdom
Oilfield services companies
Companies based in Barrow-in-Furness
Companies based in Cumbria
British companies established in 1847
1847 establishments in England
Companies listed on the London Stock Exchange
Shipping companies of the United Kingdom
Marine engineering organizations
Tanker shipping companies